The Mob is a 1951 American film noir crime-thriller produced by Columbia Pictures, directed by Robert Parrish, and starring Broderick Crawford. The screenplay, which was written by William Bowers, is based on the novel Waterfront by Ferguson Findley.

Plot
Johnny Damico, a detective going home on a rainy night, finds himself just a few feet from a shooting on a dark street. The gunman claims to be a detective from another precinct, flashing a real badge, and then slipping away. Damico discovers that the victim of the shooting was a witness who was to have appeared before a grand jury investigating waterfront crime, and that the same man who shot him also murdered the chief investigator on the case just a few hours earlier (which is where the badge came from). Damico could lose his job, but instead he is given the chance to redeem himself by the police commissioner and district attorney.

The authorities then make plans to fly Damico to New Orleans with instructions to work his way "back up", all undercover, as a New Orleans tough-guy named Tim Flynn. Once he returns home by cargo ship, Johnny has the assigned task to discover there the true identity of the head of the waterfront racketeers. All that is known about the mysterious mob boss is that his name is "Blackie" Clegg. The city in which all the action takes place is unspecified, but it is "up" relative to New Orleans, though palm trees are shown. Upon his return, while still under cover, "Flynn" gets a job locally as a longshoreman and quickly makes connections to the mob's network of enforcers as well as to crews of surrounding dockworkers. He is befriended by Tom Clancy, a fellow longshoreman who lives at the same hotel. There the two frequently meet after work for drinks, which are invariably served to them by a bartender nicknamed "Smoothie".

Damico, still posing as Flynn, now manages to hook up with union thug Joe Castro, who tries to frame Damico for murder by having his strong-arm goon Gunner temporarily seize the undercover cop's own pistol to shoot and kill a potential stoolie, Culio. Castro then has Gunner return the pistol to Damico, who the next day is arrested for the murder by a crooked police sergeant named Bennion, although Police Lt. Banks manages to spring him.

After following one blind alley involving a federal agent—the man he knows as Tom Clancy—Damico is given a tip by the bartender Smoothie, who offers to drive Damico to meet the long-sought Blackie. Once the two men are at the mob boss's office of operations, Damico is shocked when Smoothie reveals that he is actually Blackie. A gunfight ensues, Blackie is wounded but escapes, and goes to a nearby hospital, where, under a new identity, he is admitted to have his wound treated. Damico's fiancee Mary, whom the mob had kidnapped earlier and had injured while interrogating her at Blackie's office, is taken to the same hospital. When Damico later visits her, the recovering Blackie confronts the couple in Mary's hospital room. He pulls out a pistol from his hospital robe's pocket. Just as he is preparing to kill the couple, a pair of police snipers in a nearby building fatally shoot Blackie as a stands near the hospital room's window.

Cast

 Broderick Crawford as Johnny Damico
 Betty Buehler as Mary Kiernan
 Richard Kiley as Thomas "Tom" Clancy
 Otto Hulett as Police Lt. Banks
 Matt Crowley as Smoothie
 Neville Brand as Gunner
 Ernest Borgnine as Joe Castro
 Walter Klavun as Police Sgt. Bennion
 Frank DeKova as Culio
 Lynn Baggett as Peggy, Tom Clancy's wife
 Jean Alexander as Doris, Clancy's sister
 Ralph Dumke as Police Commissioner
 John Marley as Tony
 Charles Bronson as Jack, a Longshoreman (uncredited)
 Jay Adler as Russell, the Hotel Clerk (uncredited)
 Emile Meyer as Gas Station Attendant (uncredited)
 Duke Watson as Radford (uncredited)
 Carleton Young as District Attorney (uncredited)

Production
Under the working titles "Waterfront" and "Remember That Face", filming of The Mob was actually completed eight months before its release in the fall of 1951, with shooting occurring between January 11 and February 8, 1951.

Promotion
For three months after the initial distribution  of The Mob in late September 1951, Broderick Crawford conducted an extensive 60-city tour across the United States to promote the production for Columbia Pictures. He made personal appearances at screenings of the film at various locations in New York; in Hartford, Connecticut; Boston and Springfield, Massachusetts; Washington, D.C.; Cleveland; St. Louis; Memphis; and in other cities in the Midwest and on the West Coast. During those visits, among other scheduled events and activities, it became routine for Crawford to give newspaper and radio interviews, appear on local television shows, attend special dinners and receptions, make goodwill visits to police precincts, and to accept assorted awards from law enforcement agencies that wanted to honor him for his portrayal of the tough, dedicated cop Johnny Domico. In its December 12 issue, for example, the trade weekly Exhibitor provides some details about the film star's visit to Portland, Maine:

In an earlier 1951 news item about Crawford's promotional tour to Rochester, New York in October, Motion Picture Herald reported that the actor was honored there by officials, who presented him a Rochester police badge. The trade journal noted that Crawford had accumulated by then "a trunkful [of police badges] on his smash coast-to-coast personal appearance chore for THE MOB", so many badges in fact that Motion Picture Herald dubbed the actor "America's Number One Pin-On Boy".

Crawford's promotional tour to cities and towns was not limited to theaters and to law enforcement agencies. Periodically, he ventured to other sites. For instance, during his "four-day junket" touring the Boston area to promote the film at eight theaters, the star also took time to visit his alma mater, Dean Academy (now Dean College), in Franklin, Massachusetts. There he presented  a speech in the school's chapel to students and faculty, although after that presentation he returned to his routine and attended yet another special screening of The Mob at the nearby Morse Theatre.

Box office in 1951
The Mob ranked 122nd among American films that earned at least $1,000,000 in box office receipts in 1951, a time when the average cost of a movie ticket in the United States was only 47 cents and the population of the country was significantly smaller than today. At many large and small theaters, the film proved itself to be an attractive and profitable attraction. Exhibitor reports in its November 17 issue that during the picture's run at the 3,664-seat Paramount Theatre in Manhattan, it generated the second largest box office total of 1951, eclipsed that year only by the crowds of ticket-buyers who descended on the Paramount to see Martin & Lewis, when the famous comedy duo made personal appearances at the New York theatre to promote their film That's My Boy. With regard to  entire revenue totals for The Mob, various news outlets credited Crawford's publicity work with boosting the film's receipts, while the actor himself drew special attention to theater owners for their effective use of television to promote the picture. Film Bulletin is one of those outlets which noted that success in its December 17 issue:

Critical reception
In 1951, reviews of the film in major newspapers and trade publications generally ranged from mildly positive to highly favorable. Edwin Schallert, the film critic that year for the Los Angeles Times, commends the crime story for its blend of melodrama and humor, and he draws special attention to the lead performance. "The presence of Crawford in this picture", writes Schallert in his October 27 appraisal, "is its main asset", adding that the actor conducts "his role with robust ingenuity and plenty of emphasis on its amusing trimmings." The Chicago Tribune also praised the "robust" aspects of Crawford's performance, saying he "slams his way thru it in convincing fashion", as did The New York Times in its October 18, 1951 edition:
In her review of the "thrilling" film in the December 3rd issue of The Boston Globe, media critic Marjory Adams states, "'The Mob' is one of the best suspense pictures that Boston has had in many long months, and as distinguished in its more conventional way as was 'Detective Story'" (1951). After highlighting and complimenting Crawford's performance in her column, Adams turns her attention to the star's supporting cast: "Maybe there is no message to 'The Mob' but it is a first rate melodrama, handsomely and excitingly enacted by a group of lesser known but very efficient players."

Reactions to the Columbia production were quite positive as well in film-industry periodicals in 1951. The New York-based review service Harrison's Reports characterizes the feature in its September 15 preview as "a very good crime melodrama" that showcases "novel and realistic" action, which in the publication's estimation should hold theater audiences "in tense suspense all the way through." After watching an even earlier screening of the film for Motion Picture Daily, critic Charles L. Franke in his September 5 review calls the picture's climax "a dandy rendition of a standard idea" and assures moviegoers they will experience a "fine time" seeing The Mob, especially "devotees of fast-action melodrama as they watch Crawford act out the none-too-novel story". Franke in his commentary expresses further admiration for Crawford's performance and pegs him as "the actor most likely to inherit the tough-guy mantle so often worn in the past by James Cagney and Edward G. Robinson."

Film Bulletin in 1951 also summarizes the screenplay in its September 24 issue as a "Good Crime Meller For Action Fans" ("Meller" being industry slang for a melodrama) but a "fair dualler"  for general audiences. The semimonthly trade periodical, which had a targeted readership of predominantly theater owners or "exhibitors", does find some fault with the plot's lack of clarity, namely that it does not establish for moviegoers the crime boss's ultimate goals. Nevertheless, Film Bulletin states that Columbia's crime story "will please the dyed in the wool action fans with its rugged narrative of skullduggery  along the waterfront, terse dialogue and the frank brutality of the several physical encounters."

Photoplay, the leading movie fan magazine in the United States in 1951, also recommends the film in its October issue, citing most notably the drama's sustained levels of suspense and action. Describing the feature as "gutsy and fisticuffy", Photoplay informs its readers, "Suspense rides throughout the action-packed story and the scientific methods of police in action should prove frightfully discouraging to the on-the-lam set everywhere.

Later reactions to the film
In the decades after the release of The Mob, reviewers' opinions of the film appear to be more mixed than those found in the print media in 1951. Hollywood screenwriter Carl Macek in the 1979 publication Film Noir: The Encyclopedia Reference to the American Style describes the transformative performance of the film's star, noting that "Crawford takes the simple role of Johnny Damico and converts it into a noir characterization of toughness and vulgarity." Macek, however, categorizes The Mob as largely a "rehash" of the content and "staccato pacing" of pre-World War II urban crime pictures. Later, in 1984, film historian Spencer Selby reinforces that view in his book Dark City: The Film Noir, describing The Mob as "About as close as noir ever came to resurrecting the 1930s gangster film."

Film critic Dennis Schwartz in his 2002 online assessment also compliments Crawford's performance and other elements of the production, although he rates the screenplay overall as "ordinary" with an all-too-tidy conclusion:

References

External links
 
 
 
 
 

1951 films
1950s crime thriller films
American black-and-white films
American crime thriller films
Columbia Pictures films
Film noir
Films about organized crime in the United States
Films directed by Robert Parrish
Films scored by George Duning
Films based on American crime novels
1950s English-language films
1950s American films